The economy of Bangladesh is a major developing market economy. As the second-largest economy in South Asia, Bangladesh's economy is the 35th largest in the world in nominal terms, and 25th largest by purchasing power parity. Bangladesh is seen by various financial institutions as one of the Next Eleven, an emerging market, a middle income economy, and a frontier market. Bangladesh is a member of the South Asian Free Trade Area and the World Trade Organization. In fiscal year 2021–2022, Bangladesh registered a GDP growth rate of 7.2% after the global pandemic. Bangladesh is one of the fastest growing economies in the world.

Industrialisation in Bangladesh received a strong impetus after the partition of India due to labour reforms and new industries. Between 1947 and 1971, East Pakistan generated between 70% and 50% of Pakistan's exports. Modern Bangladesh embarked on economic reforms in the late 1970s which promoted free markets and foreign direct investment. By the 1990s, the country had a booming ready-made garments industry. Remittances from the large Bangladeshi diaspora became a vital source of foreign exchange reserves. Agriculture in Bangladesh is supported by government subsidies and ensures self-sufficiency in food production. Bangladesh has pursued export-oriented industrialisation.

Bangladesh experienced robust growth after the pandemic with macroeconomic stability, improvements in infrastructure, a growing digital economy, and growing trade flows. Tax collection remains very low, with tax revenues accounting for only 7.7% of GDP. Bangladesh's banking sector has a large amount of non-performing loans or loan defaults, which have caused a lot of concern. The private sector makes up 80% of GDP. The Dhaka Stock Exchange and Chittagong Stock Exchange are the two stock markets of the country. Most Bangladeshi businesses are privately owned small and medium-sized enterprises (SME) which make up 90% of all businesses.

Economic history

Punch-marked coins are the earliest form of currency found in Bangladesh, dating back to the Iron Age and the first millennium BCE. 1st century Roman coins with images of Hercules have been excavated in Bangladesh and point to trade links with the Roman world. The Wari-Bateshwar ruins are believed to be the emporium (trading center) of Sounagoura mentioned by Roman geographer Claudius Ptolemy. The eastern segment of Bengal was a historically prosperous region. The Ganges Delta provided advantages of a mild, almost tropical climate, fertile soil, ample water, and an abundance of fish, wildlife, and fruit. Living standards for the elite were comparatively better than other parts of the Indian subcontinent. Trade routes like the Grand Trunk Road, Tea Horse Road and Silk Road connected the region to the wider neighborhood. Between 400 and 1200, the region had a well-developed economy in terms of land ownership, agriculture, livestock, shipping, trade, commerce, taxation, and banking. Muslim trade with Bengal increased after the fall of the Sasanian Empire and the Arab takeover of Persian trade routes. Much of this trade occurred east of the Meghna River in southeastern Bengal. After 1204, Muslim conquerors inherited the gold and silver reserves of pre-Islamic kingdoms.

The Bengal Sultanate presided over a mercantile empire of its own. Bengali ships were the largest ships in the Bay of Bengal and other parts of the Indian Ocean trade network. Ship-owning merchants often acted as royal envoys of the Sultan. A large number of wealthy Bengali merchants and shipowners lived in Malacca. A vessel from Bengal transported embassies from Brunei and Sumatra to China. Bengal and the Maldives operated the largest shell currency network in history. A Masai giraffe from Malindi in Africa was shipped to Bengal and later gifted to the Emperor of China as a gift from the Sultan of Bengal. The rulers of Arakan looked to Bengal for economic, political and cultural capital. The Sultan of Bengal financed projects in the Hejaz region of Arabia.

Under Mughal rule, Bengal operated as a centre of the worldwide muslin, silk and pearl trades. Domestically, much of India depended on Bengali products such as rice, silks and cotton textiles. Overseas, Europeans depended on Bengali products such as cotton textiles, silks and opium; Bengal accounted for 40% of Dutch imports from Asia, for example. Bengal shipped saltpeter to Europe, sold opium in Indonesia, exported raw silk to Japan and the Netherlands, and produced cotton and silk textiles for export to Europe, Indonesia and Japan. Real wages and living standards in 18th-century Bengal were comparable to Britain, which in turn had the highest living standards in Europe.

During the Mughal era, the most important centre of cotton production was Bengal, particularly around its capital city of Dhaka, leading to muslin being called "daka" in distant markets such as Central Asia. Bengali agriculturalists rapidly learned techniques of mulberry cultivation and sericulture, establishing Bengal as a major silk-producing region of the world. Bengal accounted for more than 50% of textiles and around 80% of silks imported by the Dutch from Asia, for example.

Bengal also had a large shipbuilding industry. The shipbuilding output of Bengal during the sixteenth and seventeenth centuries was 223,250tons annually, compared with 23,061tons produced in nineteen colonies in North America from 1769 to 1771. The region was also a center of ship-repairing. Bengali shipbuilding was advanced compared to European shipbuilding at the time. An important innovation in shipbuilding was the introduction of a flushed deck design in Bengal rice ships, resulting in hulls that were stronger and less prone to leak than the structurally weak hulls of traditional European ships built with a stepped deck design. The English East India Company later duplicated the flushed-deck and hull designs of Bengal rice ships in the 1760s, leading to significant improvements in seaworthiness and navigation for European ships during the Industrial Revolution. Among the oldest businesses from the pre-colonial and Mughal periods, the biryani restaurant Fakhruddin's traces its history to the era of the Nawabs of Bengal.

The British East India Company, that took complete control of Bengal in 1793 by abolishing Nizamat (local rule), chose to develop Calcutta, now the capital city of West Bengal, as their commercial and administrative center for the Company-held territories in South Asia. The development of East Bengal was thereafter limited to agriculture. The administrative infrastructure of the late eighteenth and nineteenth centuries focused on East Bengal's function as a primarily agricultural producer—chiefly of rice, tea, teak, cotton, sugar cane and jute — for processors and traders in the British Empire. British rule saw the introduction of railways. The Hardinge Bridge was built to carry trains across the Padma River. In the early 20th century, Eastern Bengal and Assam was established in the British Raj to promote jobs, education and investment in East Bengal. In 1928, the Port of Chittagong was declared to be a "Major Port" of British India. East Bengal extended its rice economy into Arakan Division in British Burma. The river and sea ports of East Bengal, including Goalundo Ghat, the Port of Dhaka, the Port of Narayanganj, and the Port of Chittagong became entrepots for trade between Bengal, Assam and Burma. Some of Bangladesh's venerable and oldest companies were born in British Bengal, including A K Khan & Company, M. M. Ispahani Limited, James Finlay Bangladesh, and Anwar Group of Industries.

The partition of India changed the economic geography of the region. The Pakistani government in East Bengal prioritized industries based on local raw materials like jute, cotton, and leather. The Korean War drove up demand for jute products. Adamjee Jute Mills, the world's largest jute processing plant, was built in the Port of Narayanganj. The plant was a symbol of East Pakistan's industrialization. Living standards began to gradually improve. Labor reforms in 1958 eventually benefitted a future independent Bangladesh to develop industry. Free market principles were generally accepted. The government promoted an industrial policy which aimed to produce consumer goods as quickly as possible in order to avoid dependence on imports. Certain sectors, like public utilities, fell under state ownership. Natural gas in Sylhet was discovered by the Burmah Oil Company in 1955. By the late 1960s, East Pakistan's share of Pakistan's exports went down from 70% to 50%. Pakistan's rulers launched a so-called "Decade of Development" that "resulted in numerous economic and social contradictions, which played themselves out, not just in the 1960s, but beyond, where Ayub Khan’s rule created the social and economic conditions leading to the separation of East Pakistan". According to the World Bank, economic discrimination against East Pakistan included diverting foreign aid and other funds to West Pakistan, the use of East Pakistan's foreign-exchange surpluses to finance West Pakistani imports, and refusal by the central government to release funds allocated to East Pakistan. Rehman Sobhan paraphrased the Two-Nation Theory into the Two Economies Theory by arguing that East and West Pakistan diverged and became two different economies within one country.

After its independence from Pakistan, Bangladesh initially followed a socialist economy for five years, which proved to be a blunder by the Awami League government. The state nationalized all banks, insurance companies, and 580 industrial plants. Private companies had to operate under heavy regulation and restrictions. For example, profit limits were imposed on companies. Any company with revenues or profits above the limit were susceptible to nationalization. Many of the nationalized industries were abandoned by West Pakistanis during the war; while many pro-Awami League and other Bengali businesses also suffered nationalization of properties and industries. Land ownership was restricted to less than 25 bighas. Land owners with more than 25 bighas were subjected to taxes. Farmers had to sell their products at prices set by the government instead of the market. There was hardly any foreign investment. Since Bangladesh followed a socialist economy, it underwent a slow growth of producing experienced entrepreneurs, managers, administrators, engineers, and technicians. There were critical shortages of essential food grains and other staples because of wartime disruptions. External markets for jute had been lost because of the instability of supply and the increasing popularity of synthetic substitutes. Foreign exchange resources were minuscule, and the banking and monetary systems were unreliable. Although Bangladesh had a large work force, the vast reserves of under trained and underpaid workers were largely illiterate, unskilled, and underemployed. Commercially exploitable industrial resources, except for natural gas, were lacking. Inflation, especially for essential consumer goods, ran between 300 and 400 percent. The war of independence had crippled the transportation system. Hundreds of road and railroad bridges had been destroyed or damaged, and rolling stock was inadequate and in poor repair. The new country was still recovering from a severe cyclone that hit the area in 1970 and caused 250,000 deaths. India came forward immediately with critically measured economic assistance in the first months after Bangladesh achieved independence from Pakistan. Between December 1971 and January 1972, India committed US$232 million in aid to Bangladesh from the politico-economic aid India received from the US and USSR. The Awami League initiated work for the Ghorashal Fertilizer Factory and the Ashuganj Power Station. In spite of restrictions, several of Bangladesh's leading companies in the future were founded during this period, including BEXIMCO and Advanced Chemical Industries.

After 1975, Bangladeshi leaders began to promote private industry and turned their attention to developing new industrial capacity and rehabilitating the economy. The socialist economic model adopted by early leaders had resulted in inefficiency and economic stagnation. Beginning in late 1975, the government gradually gave greater scope to private sector participation in the economy, a pattern that has continued. The Dhaka Stock Exchange was re-opened in 1976. The government established special economic zones called Export Processing Zones (EPZs) to attract investors and promote export industries. These zones have played a key role in Bangladesh's export economy. The government also de-nationalized and privatized state-owned industries by either returning them to their original owners or selling them to private buyers. Inefficiency in the public sector gradually increased; and left-wing opposition grew against the export of natural gas.

The 1980s saw the emergence of dynamic local brands like PRAN. Muhammad Yunus began experimenting with microcredit in the late 1970s. In 1983, the Grameen Bank was established. Bangladesh became the pioneer of the modern microcredit industry, with leading players like Grameen Bank, BRAC and Proshika. In the industrial sector, two policy innovations in the mid-1980s helped exporters. The reforms introduced the back-to-back letter of credit and duty-drawback facilities through bonded warehouses. These reforms removed major constraints for the country's fledgling garment industry. The reforms allowed a garment manufacturer to obtain letters of credit from domestic banks to finance its import of inputs, by showing letters of credit from foreign buyers of garments. The reforms also reimbursed manufacturers the duty paid on imported inputs on proof that the inputs, stored in bonded warehouses, had been used to manufacture the exports. These reforms spurred the growth of industry into the world's second largest textile exporting sector. In the mid-1980s, there were encouraging signs of progress. Economic policies aimed at encouraging private enterprise and investment, privatising public industries, reinstating budgetary discipline, and liberalising the import regime were accelerated. The International Finance Investment and Commerce Bank was set up as a multinational bank for Bangladesh, Nepal and the Maldives.  

From 1991 to 1993, the government engaged in an enhanced structural adjustment facility (ESAF) with the International Monetary Fund (IMF). A series of economic liberalization measures was introduced by finance minister Saifur Rahman, including opening up sectors like telecom to foreign investment. The Chittagong Stock Exchange was also set up. The 1990s was a boon for the private sector. Banking, telecommunications, aviation and tertiary education saw new private players and increased competition. The  pharmaceutical industry in Bangladesh grew to meet 98% of domestic demand. The ceramics industry in Bangladesh developed to meet local demand for 96% of tableware ceramics, 77% of tiles and 89% of sanitary ceramics. The Chittagong-based steel industry in Bangladesh exploited scrap steel from ship-breaking yards and started contributing to shipbuilding in Bangladesh.

But the government failed to sustain reforms in large part because of preoccupation with the government's domestic political troubles, including tensions between the Awami League, the Bangladesh Nationalist Party (BNP) and Jatiya Party. Frequent hartals and strikes disrupted the economy. In the late 1990s the government's economic policies became more entrenched, and some gains were lost, which was highlighted by a precipitous drop in foreign direct investment in 2000 and 2001. Many new private commercial banks were given licenses to operate. Between 2001 and 2006, annual GDP growth touched an average of 5-6%. In June 2003 the IMF approved 3-year, $490-million plan as part of the Poverty Reduction and Growth Facility (PRGF) for Bangladesh that aimed to support the government's economic reform programme up to 2006. Seventy million dollars was made available immediately. In the same vein the World Bank approved $536 million in interest-free loans. The economy saw continuous real GDP growth of at least 6% since 2009. Bangladesh emerged as one of the fastest growing economies.

According to economist Syed Akhtar Mahmood, the Bangladeshi government is often seen as the villain in the country's economic story. But government has played an important role in stimulating the economy through building infrastructure, liberalizing regulations, and promoting high yielding crops in agriculture. According to Mahmood, "[m]ost roads linking the villages with one another, and with the cities, were not paved and not accessible throughout the year. This situation was remarkably transformed within a span of 10 years, from 1988 to 1997, with the construction of the so-called feeder roads. In 1988, Bangladesh had about 3,000 kilometers of feeder roads. By 1997, this network expanded to 15,500 kilometers. These “last-mile” all-weather roads helped connect the villages of Bangladesh to the rest of the country".

As a result of export-led growth, Bangladesh has enjoyed a trade surplus in recent years. Bangladesh historically has run a large trade deficit, financed largely through aid receipts and remittances from workers overseas. Foreign reserves dropped markedly in 2001 but stabilised in the US$3 to US$4 billion range (or about 3 months' import cover). In January 2007, reserves stood at $3.74 billion, and then increased to $5.8 billion by January 2008, in November 2009 it surpassed $10.0 billion, and as of April 2011 it surpassed the US$12 billion according to the Bank of Bangladesh, the central bank. The dependence on foreign aid and imports has also decreased gradually since the early 1990s. Foreign aid now accounts for only 2% of GDP.

In the last decade, poverty dropped by around one third with significant improvements in the human development index, literacy, life expectancy and per capita food consumption. With the economy growing annually at an average rate of 6% over a prolonged period, more than 15 million people have moved out of poverty since 1992. The poverty rate went down from 80% in 1971 to 44.2% in 1991 to 12.9% in 2021. In recent years, Bangladesh has focused on promoting regional trade and transport links. The Bangladesh Bhutan India Nepal Motor Vehicles Agreement seeks to create hassle free road transport across international borders. Bangladesh also signed a coastal shipping agreement with India. While prioritizing food security in the domestic market, Bangladesh exports more than US$1 billion worth of processed food products. As the result of a robust agricultural supply chain, supermarkets have sprung up in cities and towns across the country.

Bangladesh became the second largest textile exporter in the world. An estimated 4.4 million workers are employed in the garments industry, with the majority being women. The sector contributes 11% of Bangladesh's GDP. The 2013 Rana Plaza factory collapse caused global concern on industrial safety in Bangladesh, leading to the formation of the Accord on Fire and Building Safety in Bangladesh and the Alliance for Bangladesh Worker Safety. The local clothing industry has seen fiercely competitive brands vying for the market, including Aarong, Westecs, Ecstasy, and Yellow among many others.

The World Bank notes the economic progress of the country by stating that "[w]hen the newly independent country of Bangladesh was born on December 16, 1971, it was the second poorest country in the world—making the country's transformation over the next 50 years one of the great development stories. Since then, poverty has been cut in half at record speed. Enrolment in primary school is now nearly universal. Hundreds of thousands of women have entered the workforce. Steady progress has been made on maternal and child health. And the country is better buttressed against the destructive forces posed by climate change and natural disasters. Bangladesh's success comprises many moving parts—from investing in human capital to establishing macroeconomic stability. Building on this success, the country is now setting the stage for further economic growth and job creation by ramping up investments in energy, inland connectivity, urban projects, and transport infrastructure, as well as prioritizing climate change adaptation and disaster preparedness on its path toward sustainable growth".

As of 2022, Bangladesh had the second largest foreign-exchange reserves in South Asia. In 2021, Bangladesh surpassed both India and Pakistan in terms of per capita income. The country achieved 100% electricity coverage for households in 2022. Megaprojects like the Padma Bridge, Dhaka Metro, Matarbari Port, and Karnaphuli Tunnel have been planned to stimulate economic activity. The completion of Padma Bridge was expected to boost Bangladeshi GDP by 1.23%. During the Russia-Ukraine War, Bangladesh experienced pressure on its foreign exchange reserves due to rising import costs; this affected the country's electricity sector which relies on imported fuel; rising import prices also contributed to inflation.

Macro-economic trend

This is a chart of trend of gross domestic product of Bangladesh at market prices estimated by the International Monetary Fund with figures in millions of Bangladeshi Taka. However, this reflects only the formal sector of the economy.

Mean wages were $0.58 per man-hour in 2009.

The following table shows the main economic indicators in 1980–2021 (with IMF staff estimates in 2022–2027). Inflation below 5% is in green. The annual unemployment rate is extracted from the World Bank, although the International Monetary Fund find them unreliable.

Economic sectors

Agriculture

Manufacturing and industry

Many new jobs – mostly for women –  have been created by the country's dynamic private ready-made garment industry, which grew at double-digit rates through most of the 1990s. By the late 1990s, about 1.5 million people, mostly women, were employed in the garments sector as well as Leather products specially Footwear (Shoe manufacturing unit). During 2001–2002, export earnings from ready-made garments reached $3,125 million, representing 52% of Bangladesh's total exports. Bangladesh has overtaken India in apparel exports in 2009, its exports stood at 2.66 billion US dollar, ahead of India's 2.27 billion US dollar and in 2014 the export rose to $3.12 billion every month. At the fiscal year 2018, Bangladesh has been able to garner US$36.67 billion export earnings by exporting manufactured goods, of which, 83.49 percent has come from the apparel manufacturing sector.

Eastern Bengal was known for its fine muslin and silk fabric before the British period. The dyes, yarn, and cloth were the envy of much of the premodern world. Bengali muslin, silk, and brocade were worn by the aristocracy of Asia and Europe. The introduction of machine-made textiles from England in the late eighteenth century spelled doom for the costly and time-consuming hand loom process. Cotton growing died out in East Bengal, and the textile industry became dependent on imported yarn. Those who had earned their living in the textile industry were forced to rely more completely on farming. Only the smallest vestiges of a once-thriving cottage industry survived.

Other industries which have shown very strong growth include the pharmaceutical industry, shipbuilding industry, information technology, leather industry, steel industry, and light engineering industry.

Bangladesh's textile industry, which includes knitwear and ready-made garments (RMG) along with specialised textile products, is the nation's number one export earner, accounting for $21.5 billion in 2013 – 80% of Bangladesh's total exports of $27 billion.
Bangladesh is 2nd in world textile exports, behind China, which exported $120.1 billion worth of textiles in 2009. The industry employs nearly 3.5 million workers. Current exports have doubled since 2004. Wages in Bangladesh's textile industry were the lowest in the world as of 2010. The country was considered the most formidable rival to China where wages were rapidly rising and currency was appreciating. As of 2012 wages remained low for the 3 million people employed in the industry, but labour unrest was increasing despite vigorous government action to enforce labour peace. Owners of textile firms and their political allies were a powerful political influence in Bangladesh.
The urban garment industry has created more than one million formal sector jobs for women, contributing to the high female labour participation in Bangladesh.  While it can be argued that women working in the garment industry are subjected to unsafe labour conditions and low wages, Dina M. Siddiqi argues that even though conditions in Bangladesh garment factories "are by no means ideal,"  they still give women in Bangladesh the opportunity to earn their own wages.  As evidence she points to the fear created by the passage of the 1993 Harkins Bill (Child Labor Deterrence Bill), which caused factory owners to dismiss "an estimated 50,000 children, many of whom helped support their families, forcing them into a completely unregulated informal sector, in lower-paying and much less secure occupations such as brick-breaking, domestic service and rickshaw pulling."

Even though the working conditions in garment factories are not ideal, they tend to financially be more reliable than other occupations and, "enhance women's economic capabilities to spend, save and invest their incomes." Both married and unmarried women send money back to their families as remittances, but these earned wages have more than just economic benefits. Many women in the garment industry are marrying later, have lower fertility rates, and attain higher levels of education, then women employed elsewhere.

After massive labour unrest in 2006 the government formed a Minimum Wage Board including business and worker representatives which in 2006 set a minimum wage equivalent to 1,662.50 taka, $24 a month, up from Tk950. In 2010, following widespread labour protests involving 60,000 workers in June 2010, a controversial proposal was being considered by the Board which would raise the monthly minimum to the equivalent of $50 a month, still far below worker demands of 5,000 taka, $72, for entry level wages, but unacceptably high according to textile manufacturers who are asking for a wage below $30. On 28 July 2010 it was announced that the minimum entry level wage would be increased to 3,000 taka, about $43.

The government also seems to believe some change is necessary. On 21 September 2006 then ex-Prime Minister Khaleda Zia called on textile firms to ensure the safety of workers by complying with international labour law at a speech inaugurating the Bangladesh Apparel & Textile Exposition (BATEXPO).

Many Western multinationals use labour in Bangladesh, which is one of the cheapest in the world: 30 euros per month compared to 150 or 200 in China. Four days is enough for the CEO of one of the top five global textile brands to earn what a Bangladeshi garment worker will earn in her lifetime. In April 2013, at least 1,135 textile workers died in the collapse of their factory. Other fatal accidents due to unsanitary factories have affected Bangladesh: in 2005 a factory collapsed and caused the death of 64 people. In 2006, a series of fires killed 85 people and injured 207 others. In 2010, some 30 people died of asphyxiation and burns in two serious fires.

In 2006, tens of thousands of workers mobilized in one of the country's largest strike movements, affecting almost all of the 4,000 factories. The Bangladesh Garment Manufacturers and Exporters Association (BGMEA) uses police forces to crack down. Three workers were killed, hundreds more were wounded by bullets, or imprisoned. In 2010, after a new strike movement, nearly 1,000 people were injured among workers as a result of the repression.

Shipbuilding and shipbreaking

Shipbuilding is a growing industry in Bangladesh with great potential. Due to the potential of shipbuilding in Bangladesh, the country has been compared to countries like China, Japan and South Korea. Referring to the growing amount of export deals secured by the shipbuilding companies as well as the low cost labour available in the country, experts suggest that Bangladesh could emerge as a major competitor in the global market of small to medium ocean-going vessels.

Bangladesh also has the world's largest ship breaking industry which employs over 200,000 Bangladeshis and accounts for half of all the steel in Bangladesh. Chittagong Ship Breaking Yard is the world's second-largest ship breaking area.

Khulna Shipyard Limited (KSY) with over five decades of reputation has been leading the Bangladesh Shipbuilding industry and had built a wide spectrum of ships for domestic and international clients. KSY built ships for Bangladesh Navy, Bangladesh Army and Bangladesh Coast Guard under the contract of ministry of defence.

Finance

Most banks in Bangladesh are privately owned. Until the 1980s, the financial sector of Bangladesh was dominated by state-owned banks. With the grand-scale reform made in finance, private commercial banks were established through privatisation. The next finance sector reform programme was launched from 2000 to 2006 with focus on the development of financial institutions and adoption of risk-based regulations and supervision by Bangladesh Bank. As of date, the banking sector consisted of 4 SCBs, 4 government-owned specialized banks dealing in development financing, 39 private commercial banks, and 9 foreign commercial banks.

Tourism

The World Travel and Tourism Council (WTTC) reported in 2013 that the travel and tourism industry in Bangladesh directly generated 1,281,500 jobs in 2012 or 1.8 percent of the country's total employment, which ranked Bangladesh 157 out of 178 countries worldwide. Direct and indirect employment in the industry totalled 2,714,500 jobs, or 3.7 percent of the country's total employment. The WTTC predicted that by 2023, travel and tourism will directly generate 1,785,000 jobs and support an overall total of 3,891,000 jobs, or 4.2 percent of the country's total employment. This would represent an annual growth rate in direct jobs of 2.9 percent. Domestic spending generated 97.7 percent of direct travel and tourism gross domestic product (GDP) in 2012. Bangladesh's world ranking in 2012 for travel and tourism's direct contribution to GDP, as a percentage of GDP, was 142 out of 176.

in 2014 125,000 tourists visited Bangladesh. This number is extremely low relative to total population. As of 22 May 2019 the total local population numbering 166,594,000 inhabitants. This gives a ratio of 1 tourist for every 1,333 locals.

Information and communication technology

Bangladesh's information technology sector is growing example of what can be achieved after the current government's relentless effort to create a skilled workforce in ICT sector. The ICT workforce consisted of private sector and freelance skilled ICT workforce. The ICT sector also contributed to Bangladesh's economic growth. The ICT adviser to the prime minister, Sajeeb Wazed Joy is hopeful that Bangladesh will become a major player in the ICT sector in the future.
In the last 3 years, Bangladesh has seen a tremendous growth in the ICT sector. Bangladesh is a market of 160 million people with vast consumer spending around mobile phones, telco and internet. Bangladesh has 80 million internet users, an estimated 9% growth in internet use by June 2017 powered by mobile internet. Bangladesh currently has an active 23 million
Facebook users. Bangladesh currently has 143.1 million mobile phone customers.
Bangladesh has exported $800 million worth of software, games, outsourcing and services to European countries, the United States, Canada, Russia and India by 30 June 2017. The Junior Minister for ICT division of the Ministry of Post, Telecommunications and Information Technology said that Bangladesh aims to raise its export earnings from the information and communications technology (ICT) sector to $5 billion by 2021.

Investment

The stock market capitalisation of the Dhaka Stock Exchange in Bangladesh crossed $10 billion in November 2007 and the $30 billion mark in 2009, and US$50 billion in August 2010. Bangladesh had the best performing stock market in Asia during the recent global recession between 2007 and 2010, due to relatively low correlations with developed country stock markets.

Major investment in real estate by domestic and foreign-resident Bangladeshis has led to a massive building boom in Dhaka and Chittagong.

Recent (2011) trends for investing in Bangladesh as Saudi Arabia trying to secure public and private investment in oil and gas, power and transportation projects, United Arab Emirates (UAE) is keen to invest in growing shipbuilding industry in Bangladesh encouraged by comparative cost advantage, Tata, an India-based leading industrial multinational to invest Taka 1500 crore to set up an automobile industry in Bangladesh, World Bank to invest in rural roads improving quality of live, the Rwandan entrepreneurs are keen to invest in Bangladesh's pharmaceuticals sector considering its potentiality in international market, Samsung sought to lease 500 industrial plots from the export zones authority to set up an electronics hub in Bangladesh with an investment of US$1.25 billion, National Board of Revenue (NBR) is set to withdraw tax rebate facilities on investment in the capital market by individual taxpayers from the fiscal 2011–12. In 2011, Japan Bank for International Cooperation ranked Bangladesh as the 15th best investment destination for foreign investors.

2010–11 market crash

The bullish capital market turned bearish during 2010, with the exchange losing 1,800 points between December 2010 and January 2011. Millions of investors have been rendered bankrupt as a result of the market crash. The crash is believed to be caused artificially to benefit a handful of players at the expense of the big players.

Companies

The list includes ten largest Bangladeshi companies by trading value (millions in BDT) in 2018.

Composition of economic sectors

The Bangladesh Garments Manufacturers and Exporters Association (BGMEA) has predicted textile exports will rise from US$7.90 billion earned in 2005–06 to US$15
billion by 2011. In part this optimism stems from how well the sector has fared since the end of textile and clothing quotas, under the Multifibre Agreement, in early 2005.

According to a United Nations Development Programme report "Sewing Thoughts: How to Realize Human Development Gains in the Post-Quota World" Bangladesh has been able to offset a decline in European sales by cultivating new markets in the United States.

"[In 2005] we had tremendous growth. The quota-free textile regime has proved to be a big boost for our factories," said BGMEA president S.M. Fazlul Hoque told reporters, after the
sector's 24 per cent growth rate was revealed.

The Bangladesh Knitwear Manufacturers and Exporters Association (BKMEA) president Md Fazlul Hoque has also struck an optimistic tone. In an interview with United News Bangladesh he lauded the blistering growth rate, saying "The quality of our products and its competitiveness in terms of prices helped the sector achieve such... tremendous success."

Knitwear posted the strongest growth of all textile products in 2005–06, surging 35.38 per cent to US$2.82 billion. On the downside however, the sector's strong growth came amid sharp falls in prices for textile products on the world market, with growth subsequently dependent upon large increases in volume.

Bangladesh's quest to boost the quantity of textile trade was also helped by US and EU caps on Chinese textiles. The US cap restricts growth in imports of Chinese textiles to 12.5 per cent next year and between 15 and 16 per cent in 2008. The EU deal similarly manages import growth until 2008.

Bangladesh may continue to benefit from these restrictions over the next two years, however a climate of falling global textile prices forces wage rates the centre of the nation's efforts to increase market share.

They offer a range of incentives to potential investors including 10-year tax holidays, duty-free import of capital goods, raw materials and building materials, exemptions on income tax on salaries paid to foreign nationals for three years and dividend tax exemptions for the period of the tax holiday.

All goods produced in the zones are able to be exported duty-free, in addition to which Bangladesh benefits from the Generalised System of Preferences in US, European and Japanese markets and is also endowed with Most Favoured Nation status from the United States.

Furthermore, Bangladesh imposes no ceiling on investment in the EPZs and allows full repatriation of profits.

The formation of labour unions within the EPZs is prohibited as are strikes.

Bangladesh has been a world leader in its efforts to end the use of child labour in garment factories. On 4 July 1995, the Bangladesh Garment Manufacturers and Exporters Association, International Labour Organization, and UNICEF signed a memorandum of understanding on the elimination of child labour in the garment sector. Implementation of this pioneering agreement began in fall 1995, and by the end of 1999, child labour in the garment trade virtually had been eliminated. The labour-intensive process of ship breaking for scrap has developed to the point where it now meets most of Bangladesh's domestic steel needs. Other industries include sugar, tea, leather goods, newsprint, pharmaceutical, and fertilizer production.

The Bangladesh government continues to court foreign investment, something it has done fairly successfully in private power generation and gas exploration and production, as well as in other sectors such as cellular telephony, textiles, and pharmaceuticals. In 1989, the same year it signed a bilateral investment treaty with the United States, it established a Board of Investment to simplify approval and start-up procedures for foreign investors, although in practice the board has done little to increase investment. The government created the Bangladesh Export Processing Zone Authority to manage the various export processing zones. The agency currently manages EPZs in Adamjee, Chittagong, Comilla, Dhaka, Ishwardi, Karnaphuli, Mongla, and Uttara. An EPZ has also been proposed for Sylhet. The government has given the private sector permission to build and operate competing EPZs-initial construction on a Korean EPZ started in 1999. In June 1999, the AFL–CIO petitioned the U.S. Government to deny Bangladesh access to U.S. markets under the Generalized System of Preferences (GSP), citing the country's failure to meet promises made in 1992 to allow freedom of association in EPZs.

International trade

Recently, the COVID-19 pandemic has taken a heavy toll on almost all sectors of the economy, inter alia, most notably, it has caused a reduction of exports by 16.93 percent, and imports by 17 percent in the FY2019-20.

In 2015, the top exports of Bangladesh are Non-Knit Men's Suits ($5.6B), Knit T-shirts ($5.28B), Knit Sweaters ($4.12B), Non-Knit Women's Suits ($3.66B) and Non-Knit Men's Shirts ($2.52B). In  2015, the top imports of Bangladesh are Heavy Pure Woven Cotton ($1.33B), Refined Petroleum ($1.25B), Light Pure Woven Cotton ($1.12B), Raw Cotton ($1.01B) and Wheat ($900M).

In 2015, the top export destinations of Bangladesh are the United States ($6.19B), Germany ($5.17B), the United Kingdom ($3.53B), France ($2.37B) and Spain ($2.29B). In 2015, the top import origins are China ($13.9B), India ($5.51B), Singapore ($2.22B), Hong Kong ($1.47B) and Japan ($1.36B).

Bangladeshi women and the economy

As of 2014, female participation in the labour force is 58% as per World Bank data, and male participation at 82%.

A 2007 World Bank report stated that the areas in which women's work force participation have increased the most are in the fields of agriculture, education and health and social work. Over three-quarters of women in the labour force work in the agricultural sector.  On the other hand, the International Labour Organization reports that women's workforce participation has only increased in the professional and administrative areas between 2000 and 2005,  demonstrating women's increased participation in sectors that require higher education.  Employment and labour force participation data from the World Bank, the UN, and the ILO vary and often under report on women's work due to unpaid labour and informal sector jobs.  Though these fields are mostly paid, women experience very different work conditions than men, including wage differences and work benefits. Women's wages are significantly lower than men's wages for the same job with women being paid as much as 60–75 percent less than what men make.

One example of action that is being taken to improve female conditions in the work force is Non-Governmental Organisations. These NGOs encourage women to rely on their own self-savings, rather than external funds provide women with increased decision-making and participation within the family and society.   However, some NGOs that address microeconomic issues among individual families fail to deal with broader macroeconomic issues that prevent women's complete autonomy and advancement.

Historical statistics
Bangladesh has made significant strides in its economic sector performance since independence in 1971. Although the economy has improved vastly in the 1990s, Bangladesh still suffers in the area of foreign trade in South Asian. Despite major impediments to growth like the inefficiency of state-owned enterprises, a rapidly growing labour force that cannot be absorbed by agriculture, inadequate power supplies, and slow implementation of economic reforms, Bangladesh has made some headway improving the climate for foreign investors and liberalising the capital markets; for example, it has negotiated with foreign firms for oil and gas exploration, bettered the countrywide distribution of cooking gas, and initiated the construction of natural gas pipelines and power stations. Progress on other economic reforms has been halting because of opposition from the bureaucracy, public sector unions, and other vested interest groups.

The especially severe floods of 1998 increased the flow of international aid. So far the global financial crisis has not had a major impact on the economy. Foreign aid has seen a gradual decline over the last few decades but economists see this as a good sign for self-reliance. There has been a dramatic growth in exports and remittance inflow which has helped the economy to expand at a steady rate.

Bangladesh has been on the list of UN Least Developed Countries (LDC) since 1975. Bangladesh met the requirements to be recognised as a developing country in March, 2018  with Bangladesh's Gross National Income (GNI) US$1,724 per capita, the Human Assets Index (HAI) 72 and the Economic Vulnerability (EVI) Index 25.2 then. Bangladesh's GNI is now forecasted to reach at US$4,753.39 in 2030.

Gross export and import

See also
 Bangladesh Academy for Rural Development
 Electricity sector in Bangladesh
 Automotive industry in Bangladesh
 Textile industry in Bangladesh
 Ceramics industry in Bangladesh
 Electronics industry in Bangladesh
 Federation of Bangladesh Chambers of Commerce & Industries
 List of companies of Bangladesh
List of megaprojects in Bangladesh
 List of the largest trading partners of Bangladesh
 Ministry of Industries (Bangladesh)
 List of countries by 4G LTE penetration
 Corruption in Bangladesh
 Poverty in Bangladesh
 Prostitution in Bangladesh
 Crime in Bangladesh
 Human rights in Bangladesh
 Child labour in Bangladesh

References

External links
 
 Bangladesh Economic News 
 Bangladesh Budget 2007 – 2008
 Budget in Brief 2016–17
 World Bank Summary Trade Statistics Bangladesh, 2007

 
Bangladesh